Diana Davies is the name of:

 Diana Davies (actress) (born 1936), British actress
 Diana Davies (athlete) (born 1961), British high jumper
 Diana Davies (photographer), American photographer